Winthorpe Bridge is a concrete box girder bridge, carrying the A1 road over the River Trent in east Nottinghamshire.

History

Construction
The contracts for the bridge were awarded on 20 March 1962 for £495,695, and construction began on 16 July 1962. The six-mile bypass was to cost £3,250,000. It was opened on 27 July 1964, by Ernest Marples.

When being built, in July 1962, ten tree trunks were unearthed during the building of foundations, which were thought to be 500,000 years old.

The bridge was constructed by the Danish bridge-builder Christiani & Nielsen, who also built the M2 Medway Bridge which opened in May 1963. Another Danish civil engineering company Bierrum built the near cooling towers, along the River Trent to the north. The Newark bypass was built by Robert McGregor & Sons who would have laid the concrete pavement on the bridge. The north-bound surface had the concrete pavement laid in forty days, with three concrete-batching sites along the bypass preparing the concrete.

The bridge was Grade II listed (1323680) on 29 May 1998.

Structure
The bridge crosses the River Trent in Winthorpe, Nottinghamshire, which is the third-longest river in England, at 185 miles. It is a reinforced-concrete bridge made out of nine box girders.

References

 Modern British bridges, 1 January 1965, Dorothy Henry,

External links
 Winthorpe Bridge at SABRE Wiki

A1 road (Great Britain)
Box girder bridges in the United Kingdom
Bridges across the River Trent
Bridges completed in 1964
Bridges in Nottinghamshire
Concrete bridges in the United Kingdom
Grade II listed bridges
Grade II listed buildings in Nottinghamshire
Newark and Sherwood
Road bridges in England